Dr. Cindy Lou Courville (born 1954) was the U.S. Ambassador to the African Union from 2006 to 2008. Previously she was Special Assistant to the President and Senior Director for African Affairs at the National Security Council where she helped craft United States policy towards Africa.

Early life and education
Courville was raised in Opelousas, Louisiana and served as secretary of her town's NAACP chapter when she was 15 years old. Her father worked for International Harvester while her mother was a seamstress and cook at Courville's childhood school.

Ambassador Courville graduated from the University of Louisiana at Lafayette with a B.A. and M.A. in political science and an M.A. and Ph.D. from the University of Denver's Graduate School of International Studies (now the Josef Korbel School of International Studies), in comparative politics and international relations.

Professional experience
Ambassador Courville currently serves as COO and EVP, PMIC Global.  
Ambassador Courville's professional experience includes ten years in the University arena as a member of the political science faculty at Hanover College in Indiana and Occidental College in Los Angeles. She was an Honorary Research Fellow at the University of Zimbabwe; a Shell Oil Fellow at the University of Denver; and a Ford Minority Post-Doctoral Fellow at the University of California at Los Angeles.

In 2008, Courville received an honorary doctorate from her alma mater, the University of Louisiana at Lafayette.

Government work
Ambassador Courville went to the NSC from the Defense Intelligence Agency (DIA), where she served as a Senior Intelligence Officer in the Office of the Chief of Staff. In her career at DIA, she also served the Deputy Assistant Defense Intelligence Office for Africa Policy as a liaison to the Office of the Secretary of Defense for Africa, the National Security Council, the Department of State, and the Office of the Secretary of Defense. Ambassador Courville was also the Director for East African Affairs in the Office of the Secretary of Defense where she was responsible for the coordination of U.S. military and security policy with East Africa and the Horn of Africa. Ambassador Courville previously served as Director for African Affairs at the National Security Council from June 2001 through August 2003.

References

External links
 Cindy Courville bio
 Courville Receives Honorary Doctorate from the University of Louisiana at Lafayette

1954 births
Living people
Place of birth missing (living people)
People from Opelousas, Louisiana
University of Louisiana at Lafayette alumni
University of Denver alumni
Josef Korbel School of International Studies people
Hanover College faculty
Occidental College faculty
Representatives of the United States to the African Union
African-American diplomats
American women ambassadors
21st-century American diplomats
21st-century African-American people
21st-century African-American women
20th-century African-American people
20th-century African-American women